Russian State University of Physical Education, Sport, Youth and Tourism (SCOLIPE)  is a university in Moscow, founded in 1918.

Names 
 1918 – Moscow State University of Physical Education
 1920 – State Central Institute of Physical Education (SCIPE)
 1934 – State Central Order of Lenin Institute of Physical Education (SCOLIPE)
 1937 – State Central Order of Lenin Institute of Physical Education "Marshal Joseph Stalin"
 1961 – State Central Order of Lenin Institute of Physical Education (SCOLIPE)
 1993 – Russian State Academy of Physical Education (RSAPE)
 2001 – Russian State University of Physical Education, Sport, Youth and Tourism (RSUPESY&T)

Notable alumni 
Many graduates are European, World, Olympic and Paralympic champions:

Concentration 
 Athletics: Valery Brumel, Svetlana Kriveleva, Natalia Lisovskaya, Pyotr Bolotnikov
 Biathlon: Olga Zaitseva, Anfisa Reztsova
 Bobsleigh: Alexey Negodaylo
 Chess: Yuri Balashov, Viktor Bologan, Miron Sher

 Cycling: Yuri Kashirin
 Diving: Elena Vaytsekhovskaya
 Fencing: Sergey Sharikov, Aleksey Frosin, David Tyshler 
 Figure skating: Irina Rodnina, Andrey Bukin, Natalia Bestemianova, Anna Semenovich, Irina Slutskaya, Ekaterina Gordeeva, Sergei Grinkov, Maria Butyrskaya, Gennady Karponosov, Irina Moiseeva
 Football: Lev Yashin, Dmitri Sychev, Devidas Shemberas
 Judo: Dmitriy Nosov
 Hockey: Aleksey Morozov, Alexander Ovechkin, Ilya Kovalchuk, Pavel Bure, Valery Kharlamov,
 Rowing: Alexander Timoshinin
 Skiing: Olga Zavyalova
 Speed skating: Oleg Goncharenko, Svetlana Zhurova
 Synchronized swimming: Olga Brusnikina
 Wrestling: Boris Gurevich, Nikolai Balboshin
 Weightlifting: David Adamovich Rigert

Other
 Andrey Guryev, billionaire, former CEO of PhosAgro

Notable faculty
 David Tyshler (1927–2014), Ukrainian/Soviet Olympic bronze medalist fencer

Selected departments and specializations

Chess 
 (1908–1976), in 1966, was the founding head of the postbaccalaureate program in chess which initially was organized as an academic specialization of the institution. In 1974, the specialization program was upgraded to the Chess Department that offered a Master of Sport in Chess. The chess program is chronicled as the first in the history of higher education.

The Master of Sports in Chess should not be confused with the title and rank, which was established for men in 1934 and for women in 1950. From 1934 through 1987, the USSR conferred 1,061 Master of Sport in Chess titles – 904 to men and 157 to women. The Master of Sport of the USSR was a nationally distinguished rank and title for many major sports of the former Soviet Union.

Notes and references

Notes

References 

  (publisher link – )

 . 

 

 

 .

External links 

1918 establishments in Russia
Education in the Soviet Union
Sport in the Soviet Union
Public universities and colleges in Russia
Sports academies
Sports schools
National Institutes of Sport
Universities in Moscow
Educational institutions established in 1918